Baška is a village and a municipality located on the south east of the island of Krk, in Primorje-Gorski Kotar County, Croatia. According to the 2011 census, the municipality has a population of 1,674, with 981 in Baška itself.

This cultural and historical center with its old stone houses and narrow streets, has been a tourist destination since the 19th century, and has developed into a popular resort. It is known for its inscribed stone monument from 1100, for its many surrounding beaches, and its long tradition in tourism.

Baška has a rich cultural and historical heritage. Highlights are the early Christian archeological site from the 5th century, the renowned Baška tablet from the year 1100 found in the Church of St. Lucy in the nearby Jurandvor, the remains of a Roman settlement, as well as many historical churches and chapels. The local museum in Baška houses an ethnographic collection.

Baška is surrounded by woodlands and many sand and pebble beaches, most notably the 1,800-meter-long Baška beach (the Vela plaža, or “Great Beach”). Bunculuka beach is a smaller clothing optional pebble beach adjacent to the large Bunculuka naturist camping site. In the surrounding area there are 16 hiking trails with a total length of over 80 km. Medicinal and other herbs grow in abundance, including wormwood, sage, thyme, and milfoil.

Monuments and sights

Art installation "Drops" 

On the high and rounded ridges above Baška there is a place known as Ljubimer. It is where a site-specific art installation called "Drops", created by prestigious Chilean authors Smiljan Radić and Marcela Correa, found its permanent place. It is a unique work of art, designed to permanently adorn this charismatic place. The installation placed additional emphasis on traditional dry stone walls called "mrgari", respecting their values and structure, and not overshadowing them in design or materials. 

The authors describe its character: "Sometimes we find anonymous pieces that have been manufactured in strategically chosen places – and later abandoned – by others. They are naturally primitive, part of a lost memory… like the long dry stone wall in Baška. In these cases, the reality of the object is as important as discovering it by surprise, as if we were the first explorers to come across it."

References

External links

 
 Baška tourist bureau

Krk
Municipalities of Croatia
Populated places in Primorje-Gorski Kotar County
Seaside resorts in Croatia
Populated coastal places in Croatia